Yendi Airport  is an airport serving Yendi, a town in the Northern Region of Ghana.

References

Airports in Ghana